FC Spartak Moscow is a Russian professional football club based in Moscow. Having won 12 Soviet championships (second only to Dynamo Kyiv) and a record 10 Russian championships, it is the country's most successful club. They have also won a record 10 Soviet Cups, 4 Russian Cups and one Russian Super Cup. Spartak have also reached the semi-finals of all three European club competitions.

History

Foundation and early period (1883-1941)

In the early days of Soviet football, government agencies such as the police, army, and railroads created their own clubs. Many statesmen saw in the wins of their teams the superiority over the opponents patronising other teams. Almost all the teams had such kind of patrons; Dynamo Moscow aligned with the Militsiya, CSKA Moscow with the Red Army, and Spartak, created by a trade union public organization, was considered to be "the people's team".

The history of the football club and sports society "Spartak" originates from the Russian Gymnastics Society (RGO "Sokol"), which was founded on 16 May 1883. The society was founded under the influence of the Pan-Slavic "Sokol movement" with the aim of promoting the "Sokolsk gymnastics" and then sports including fencing, wrestling, figure skating, skating, football, hockey, lawn tennis, boxing, skis, athletics, and cycling. In the RGO Sokol began to play football in the summer of 1897; the professional football section was founded in the spring of 1909. On 1 August 1920, the football team began to officially act under the name MCS, or Moscow Sports Club.

In 1923, the MCS, later named Krasnaya Presnya (Red Presnya), was formed by Ivan Artemyev and involved Nikolai Starostin, especially in its football team. Presnya is a district of Moscow renowned for the radical politics of its inhabitants; for example, it represented the centre of the Moscow uprising of 1905.

The team grew, building a stadium, supporting itself from ticket sales and playing matches across the Russian SFSR. As part of a 1926 reorganization of football in the Soviet Union, Starostin arranged for the club to be sponsored by the food workers union and the club moved to the 13,000 seat Tomsky Stadium, known as Pishcheviki. The team changed sponsors repeatedly over the following years as it competed with Dinamo Moscow, whose 35,000 seat Dynamo Stadium lay close by.

As a high-profile sportsman, Starostin came into close contact with Alexander Kosarev, secretary of the Komsomol (Communist Union of Youth) who already had a strong influence on sport and wanted to extend it. In November 1934, with funding from Promkooperatsiia, Kosarev employed Starostin and his brothers to develop his team to make it more powerful. Again the team changed its name, this time to "Spartak Moscow" (the name Spartak means "Spartacus", a gladiator who led an uprising against Ancient Rome).

The club founders, four Starostin brothers, played a big role in the formation of the team. The Starostins played for the red-whites in the 1930s but right before World War II they were subjected to repression as the leaders of the most hated team by the state authorities. Elder brother Nikolai Starostin wrote in his books that he had survived in the State Prison System due to his participation in football and with Spartak (after the political rehabilitation, in 1954, he would later return to the team as the squad's manager).

In 1935, Starostin proposed the name Spartak. It was inspired by the Italian novel Spartaco, written by Raffaello Giovagnoli, and means Spartacus ("Spartak" in Russian), a gladiator-slave who led a rebellion against Rome. Starostin is also credited with the creation of the Spartak logo. The same year, the club became a part of newly created Spartak sports society.

Czechoslovak manager Antonin Fivebr is credited as the first head coach of Spartak, though he worked as a consultant in several clubs simultaneously. In 1936, the Soviet Top League was established, where its first championship was won by Dynamo Moscow while Spartak won its second, which was held in the same calendar year. Before World War II, Spartak earned two more titles. In 1937, Spartak won the football tournament of Workers' Olympiad at Antwerp.

Post-war period (1945-1991)

During the 1950s, Spartak, together with Dynamo, dominated the Soviet Top League. When the Soviet national team won gold medals at the Melbourne Olympics, it consisted largely of Spartak players. Spartak captain Igor Netto was the captain of the national team from 1954 to 1963. In the 1960s, Spartak won two league titles, but by the mid-1960s, Spartak was no more regarded as a leading Soviet club. The club was even less successful in the 1970s and in 1976 Spartak was relegated into the lower league.

During the following season, the stadium was still full as the club's fans stayed with the team during its time in the lower division. Konstantin Beskov, who became the head coach (as a footballer Beskov made his name playing for Spartak's main rivals, Dynamo Moscow), introduced several young players, including Rinat Dasayev and Georgi Yartsev. Spartak came back the next year and won the title in 1979, beating Dynamo Kyiv.

On 20 October 1982, disaster struck during the UEFA Cup match between Spartak and Dutch club HFC Haarlem. Sixty-six people died in a stampede during the match, making it Russia's worst sporting disaster.

In 1989, Spartak won its last USSR Championship, rivals Dynamo Kyiv 2–1 in the closing round. Spartak's striker Valery Shmarov scored the "golden" free kick with almost no time left. The next season, Spartak reached the European Cup semi-final, consequently eliminating Napoli on penalties and Real Madrid (with 3–1 away victory), but losing to Marseille.

Modern period (1991-present)

Initial success (1991-2004)

A new page in the club's history began when the Soviet Union collapsed and its championship ceased to exist. In the newly created Russian league, Spartak, led by coach and president Oleg Romantsev, dominated and won all but one title between 1992 and 2001. Year-after-year the team also represented Russia in the Champions League.

Problems began in the new century, however. Several charismatic players (Ilya Tsymbalar and Andrey Tikhonov among others) left the club as a result of conflict with Romantsev. Later, Romantsev sold his stock to oil magnate Andrei Chervichenko, who in 2003 became the club president. The two were soon embroiled in a row that would continue until Romantsev was sacked in 2003 with the club suffering several sub-par seasons until Chervichenko finally sold his stock in 2004. The new ownership made a number of front office changes with the aim of returning the team to the top of the Russian Premier League.

Spartak has been entitled to place a golden star on its badge since 2003 to commemorate winning five Russian championships in 1992, 1993, 1994, 1996 and 1997. They have won the championship another four times since 1997.

Title-less run (2004-2016) 
In the 2005 season, Spartak, led by Aleksandrs Starkovs, finished second in the league to beat Lokomotiv Moscow, Zenit Saint Petersburg and Rubin Kazan to the last Champions League place. Following a mixed start to the 2006 season and public criticism from Dmitry Alenichev, the team's captain and one of its most experienced players, Starkovs left his position to Vladimir Fedotov.

In the 2012–13 season, Spartak qualified for the 2012–13 UEFA Champions League group stage and finished last after disappointing performances against FC Barcelona, Celtic and Benfica. In the league, Spartak finished in fourth place while in the cup it was eliminated in the round of 16 by FC Rostov 0–0 , completing a disappointing season. 

Since 2013, the club have added another three stars as rules allowed teams to include titles won during the Soviet era.

The next 3 seasons (2013–14, 2014–15, 2015–16) were somewhat similar as Spartak finished 6th, 6th and 5th accordingly while the club did not qualify for European Competitions.

Revival (2016-2022)
By the beginning of the 2016–17 season, under ex-Juventus manager Massimo Carrera, Spartak had acquired a squad consisting of foreign talents such as Quincy Promes, Fernando, Zé Luís, Lorenzo Melgarejo and Russians such as Denis Glushakov, Roman Zobnin and Ilya Kutepov. Spartak won the 2016–17 Russian Premier League with the squad, winning most derbies and ultimately finishing with a difference of 7 points. 

The following season, Spartak participated in the 2017–18 UEFA Champions League group stage. Despite suffering its greatest ever loss in a 7-0 result against Liverpool F.C. at Anfield, the club achieved considerable victories, including a 5-1 win against Sevilla FC.

Having finished second 2020-21 Russian Premier League under manager Domenico Tedesco, whose contract expired at the season's end, Spartak followed up with a successful run in the 2021–22 UEFA Europa League, now led by Rui Vitoria. Spartak topped its group, which included Napoli (which it defeated both home and away), Leicester City and Legia Warsaw. It was set to face RB Leipzig in the round of 16, but the club - along with all Russian club and national teams - was suspended from FIFA, UEFA and the ECA until further notice due to Russia's invasion of Ukraine. 

On 29 May 2022, in the final match of Paolo Vanoli (manager since December 2021), Spartak won the 2021–22 Russian Cup.

New ownership (2022-present)

On June 10, 2022, the new head coach of Spartak was appointed - 33-year-old Spanish specialist Guillermo Abascal. He became the youngest head coach in Spartak history. The contract was signed for two years. Along with Abascal, the Spartak coaching staff included: assistants - Carlos Maria Valle Moreno and Vladimir Sliskovich, physical training coaches - Fernando Perez Lopez and Alexander Zaichenko and goalkeeper coach Vasily Kuznetsov. On August 22, 2022, PJSC Lukoil Oil Company announced the acquisition of 100% of the shares of the club Spartak Moscow, as well as the Otkritie Bank Arena stadium. It was also reported that Leonid Fedun has resigned as a shareholder of the club, he resigned as president, member and chairman of the club's board of directors and ceased to take part in the management of Spartak. 

Fedun owned the club for 18 years and 4 months. During this time, Spartak has become the champion of Russia once, winner of the Cup of Russia and the Super Cup of Russia, won six silver medals and one bronze medal in the championship, and has made it to the group round of the Champions League four times. On September 26, 2022 Alexander Matytsyn, first vice president of Lukoil, became chairman of the board of directors of FC Spartak. Lukoil's top managers Pavel Zhdanov, Ivan Maslyaev, and Yevgeny Khavkin also joined the board of directors, the general director of the club Yevgeny Melezhikov, president of the Spartak Academy Sergei Rodionov, as well as independent directors Oleg Malyshev and Yusuf Alekperov. Also, a new sports director of the club, 52-year-old Englishman Paul Ashworth, was appointed.

Honours

Domestic competitions

Soviet Top League/Russian Premier League
Champions (22) (record): 1936 (autumn), 1938, 1939, 1952, 1953, 1956, 1958, 1962, 1969, 1979, 1987, 1989 / 1992, 1993, 1994, 1996, 1997, 1998, 1999, 2000, 2001, 2016–17
Runners-up (16): 1937, 1954, 1955, 1963, 1974, 1980, 1981, 1983, 1984, 1985, 1991, 2005, 2006, 2007, 2009, 2011–12, 2020–21

Soviet Cup/Russian Cup
Winners (14) (record): 1938, 1939, 1946, 1947, 1950, 1958, 1963, 1965, 1971, 1992, 1993–94, 1997–98, 2002–03, 2021–22
Runners-up (7): 1948, 1952, 1957, 1972, 1981, 1995–96, 2005–06

Russian Super Cup
Winners: 2017
Runners-up (4): 2004, 2006, 2007, 2022

Soviet First League
Champions: 1977

USSR Federation Cup
Winners: 1987

International

 Commonwealth of Independent States Cup
Winners (6): 1993, 1994, 1995, 1999, 2000, 2001
Runners-up: 1997, 1998, 2002

Non-official
Match Premier Cup
Winners: 2019, 2020, 2021

Ciutat de Barcelona Trophy
Winners: 1982

Copa del Sol
Winners: 2012

Notable European campaigns

UEFA club coefficient ranking
As of 7 May 2021, Source:

League history

Soviet Union
{| class="wikitable mw-collapsible mw-collapsed"  style="margin:auto; border:1px solid #aaa; font-size:90%;"
|- style="background:#efefef;"
! Season
! Div.
! Pos.
! Pl.
! W
! D
! L
! GS
! GA
! P
!Cup
!colspan=2|Europe
!Top scorer (league)
!Manager/acting manager
|-
||1936 (s)||rowspan="40"|1st|| style="background:bronze;"|3||6||3||1||2||12||7||13||-||colspan="2"|-||align="left"| Glazkov – 4||align="left"| Kozlov
|-
||1936 (a)|| style="background:gold;"|1||7||4||2||1||19||10||17||QF||colspan="2"|-||align="left"| Glazkov – 7||align="left"| Kozlov
|-
||1937|| style="background:silver;"|2||16||8||5||3||24||16||37||R16||colspan="2"|-||align="left"| Rumyantsev – 8||align="left"| Kvashnin
|-
||1938|| style="background:gold;"|1||25||18||3||4||74||19||39|| style="background:gold;"|W||colspan="2"|-||align="left"| Sokolov – 18||align="left"| Kvashnin  P.Popov
|-
||1939|| style="background:gold;"|1||26||14||9||3||58||23||37|| style="background:gold;"|W||colspan="2"|-||align="left"| Semyonov – 18||align="left"| P.Popov
|-
||1940|| style="background:bronze;"|3||24||13||5||6||54||35||31||-||colspan="2"|-||align="left"| Semyonov – 13  Kornilov – 13||align="left"| Gorokhov
|-
||1944||colspan="8"|no league competition||SF||colspan="2"|-|| style="text-align:center;"|-||align="left"| Kvashnin
|-
||1945||10||22||6||3||13||22||44||15||R16||colspan="2"|-||align="left"| Timakov – 7||align="left"| Isakov  Vollrat
|-
||1946||6||22||8||5||9||38||40||21|| style="background:gold;"|W||colspan="2"|-||align="left"| Salnikov – 9||align="left"|Vollrat
|-
||1947||8||24||6||9||9||34||26||21|| style="background:gold;"|W||colspan="2"|-||align="left"| Dementyev – 9||align="left"|Vollrat
|-
||1948|| style="background:bronze;"|3||26||18||1||7||64||34||37|| style="background:silver;"|RU||colspan="2"|-||align="left"| Konov – 15||align="left"| Kvashnin
|-
||1949|| style="background:bronze;"|3||34||21||7||6||93||43||49||SF||colspan="2"|-||align="left"| Simonyan – 26||align="left"| Dangulov
|-
||1950||5||36||17||10||9||77||40||44|| style="background:gold;"|W||colspan="2"|-||align="left"| Simonyan – 34||align="left"| Dangulov
|-
||1951||6||28||13||5||10||50||35||31||QF||colspan="2"|-||align="left"| Simonyan – 10||align="left"| Dangulov  Gorokhov  Glazkov
|-
||1952|| style="background:gold;"|1||13||9||2||2||26||12||20|| style="background:silver;"|RU||colspan="2"|-||align="left"| Paramonov – 8||align="left"| Sokolov
|-
||1953|| style="background:gold;"|1||20||11||7||2||47||15||29||QF||colspan="2"|-||align="left"| Simonyan – 14||align="left"| Sokolov
|-
||1954|| style="background:silver;"|2||24||14||3||7||49||26||31||R16||colspan="2"|-||align="left"| Ilyin – 11||align="left"| Sokolov
|-
||1955|| style="background:silver;"|2||22||15||3||4||55||27||33||SF||colspan="2"|-||align="left"| Parshin – 13||align="left"| Gulyaev
|-
||1956|| style="background:gold;"|1||22||15||4||3||68||28||34||-||colspan="2"|-||align="left"| Simonyan – 16||align="left"| Gulyaev
|-
||1957|| style="background:bronze;"|3||22||11||6||5||43||28||28|| style="background:silver;"|RU||colspan="2"|-||align="left"| Simonyan – 12||align="left"| Gulyaev
|-
||1958|| style="background:gold;"|1||22||13||6||3||55||28||32|| style="background:gold;"|W||colspan="2"|-||align="left"| Ilyin – 19||align="left"| Gulyaev
|-
||1959||6||22||8||8||6||32||28||24||-||colspan="2"|-||align="left"| Isaev – 8||align="left"| Gulyaev
|-
||1960||7||30||15||7||8||52||32||37||R16||colspan="2"|-||align="left"| Ilyin – 13||align="left"| Simonyan
|-
||1961|| style="background:bronze;"|3||30||16||8||6||57||34||40||R16||colspan="2"|-||align="left"| Khusainov – 14||align="left"| Simonyan
|-
||1962|| style="background:gold;"|1||32||21||5||6||61||25||47||R16||colspan="2"|-||align="left"| Sevidov – 16||align="left"| Simonyan
|-
||1963|| style="background:silver;"|2||38||22||8||8||65||33||52|| style="background:gold;"|W||colspan="2"|-||align="left"| Sevidov – 15||align="left"| Simonyan
|-
||1964||8||32||12||8||12||34||32||32||SF||colspan="2"|-||align="left"| Sevidov – 6||align="left"| Simonyan
|-
||1965||8||32||10||12||10||28||26||32|| style="background:gold;"|W||colspan="2"|-||align="left"| Khusainov – 5  Reingold – 5||align="left"| Simonyan
|-
||1966||4||36||15||12||9||45||41||42||QF||colspan="2"|-||align="left"| Osyanin – 15||align="left"| Gulyaev
|-
||1967||7||36||13||14||9||38||30||40||R32||CWC||R16||align="left"| Khusainov – 8||align="left"| Salnikov  Simonyan
|-
||1968|| style="background:silver;"|2||38||21||10||7||64||43||52||R32||colspan="2"|-||align="left"| Khusainov – 14||align="left"| Simonyan
|-
||1969|| style="background:gold;"|1||32||24||6||2||51||15||54||R32||colspan="2"|-||align="left"| Osyanin – 16||align="left"| Simonyan
|-
||1970|| style="background:bronze;"|3||32||12||14||6||43||25||38||QF||colspan="2"|-||align="left"| Khusainov – 12||align="left"| Simonyan
|-
||1971||6||30||9||13||8||35||31||31|| style="background:gold;"|W||ECC||R32||align="left"| Kiselyov – 5  Silagadze – 5  Piskarev – 5||align="left"| Simonyan
|-
||1972||11||30||8||10||12||29||30||26|| style="background:silver;"|RU||UC||R32||align="left"| Papaev – 4  Andreev – 4  Piskarev – 4||align="left"| Simonyan
|-
||1973||4||30||14||8||8||37||28||31||QF||CWC||QF||align="left"| Piskarev – 12||align="left"| Gulyaev
|-
||1974|| style="background:silver;"|2||30||15||9||6||41||23||39||QF||colspan="2"|-||align="left"| Piskarev – 10||align="left"| Gulyaev
|-
||1975||10||30||9||10||11||27||30||28||R16||UC||R64||align="left"| Lovchev – 8||align="left"| Gulyaev
|-
||1976 (s)||14||15||4||2||9||10||18||10||-||UC||R16||align="left"| Pilipko – 2  Lovchev – 2  Bulgakov – 2||align="left"| Krutikov
|-
||1976 (a)|| style="background:pink;"|15||15||5||3||7||15||18||13||R32||colspan="2"|-||align="left"| Bulgakov – 6||align="left"| Krutikov
|-
||1977||2nd|| style="background:lightgreen;"|1||38||22||10||6||83||42||54||R16||colspan="2"|-||align="left"| Yartsev – 17||align="left"| Beskov
|-
||1978||rowspan="14"|1st||5||30||14||5||11||42||33||33||R16||colspan="2"|-||align="left"| Yartsev – 19||align="left"| Beskov
|-
||1979|| style="background:gold;"|1||34||21||10||3||66||25||50||Qual.||colspan="2"|-||align="left"| Yartsev – 14||align="left"| Beskov
|-
||1980|| style="background:silver;"|2||34||18||9||7||49||26||45||SF||colspan="2"|-||align="left"| Rodionov – 7||align="left"| Beskov
|-
||1981|| style="background:silver;"|2||34||19||8||7||70||40||46|| style="background:silver;"|RU||ECC||QF||align="left"| Gavrilov – 21||align="left"| Beskov
|-
||1982|| style="background:bronze;"|3||34||16||9||9||59||35||41||Qual.||UC||R32||align="left"| Shavlo – 11||align="left"| Beskov
|-
||1983|| style="background:silver;"|2||34||18||9||7||60||25||45||R16||UC||R16||align="left"| Gavrilov – 18||align="left"| Beskov
|-
||1984|| style="background:silver;"|2||34||18||9||7||53||29||45||QF||UC||QF||align="left"| Rodionov – 13||align="left"| Beskov
|-
||1985|| style="background:silver;"|2||34||18||10||6||72||28||46||R16||UC||R16||align="left"| Rodionov – 14||align="left"| Beskov
|-
||1986|| style="background:bronze;"|3||30||14||9||7||52||21||37||SF||UC||R16||align="left"| Rodionov – 17||align="left"| Beskov
|-
||1987|| style="background:gold;"|1||30||16||11||3||49||26||42||R16||UC||R16||align="left"| Rodionov – 12  Cherenkov – 12||align="left"| Beskov
|-
||1988||4||30||14||11||5||40||26||39||QF||UC||R32||align="left"| Rodionov – 12||align="left"| Beskov
|-
||1989|| style="background:gold;"|1||30||17||10||3||49||19||44||QF||ECC||R16||align="left"| Rodionov – 16||align="left"| Romantsev
|-
||1990||5||24||12||5||7||39||26||29||R16||UC||R32||align="left"| Shmarov – 12||align="left"| Romantsev
|-
||1991|| style="background:silver;"|2||30||17||7||6||57||30||41||QF||ECC||SF||align="left"| Mostovoi – 13  Radchenko – 13||align="left"| Romantsev
|-
||1992||-||colspan="8"|-|| style="background:gold;"|W||UC||R32|| style="text-align:center;"|-||align="left"| Romantsev
|}

Russia
{| class="wikitable mw-collapsible mw-collapsed"  style="margin:auto; border:1px solid #aaa; font-size:90%;"
|- style="background:#efefef;"
! Season
! Div.
! Pos.
! Pl.
! W
! D
! L
! GS
! GA
! P
!Cup
!colspan=2|Europe
!Top scorer (league)
!Manager/acting manager
|-
||1992||rowspan="30"|1st|| style="background:gold;"|1||26||18||7||1||62||19||43||-||colspan="2"|-||align="left"| Radchenko – 12||align="left"| Romantsev
|-
||1993|| style="background:gold;"|1||34||21||11||2||81||18||53||R32||CWC||SF||align="left"| Beschastnykh – 18||align="left"| Romantsev
|-
||1994|| style="background:gold;"|1||30||21||8||1||73||21||50|| style="background:gold;"|W||UCL||GS||align="left"| Beschastnykh – 10||align="left"| Romantsev
|-
||1995|| style="background:bronze;"|3||30||19||7||5||76||26||63||SF||UCL||GS||align="left"| Shmarov – 16||align="left"| Romantsev
|-
||1996|| style="background:gold;"|1||35||22||9||4||72||35||75|| style="background:silver;"|RU||UCL||QF||align="left"| Tikhonov – 16||align="left"| Yartsev
|-
||1997|| style="background:gold;"|1||34||22||7||5||67||30||73||QF||UC||R32||align="left"| Kechinov – 11||align="left"| Romantsev
|-
||1998|| style="background:gold;"|1||30||17||8||5||58||27||59|| style="background:gold;"|W||UCL  UC||Qual. SF||align="left"| Tsymbalar – 10||align="left"| Romantsev
|-
||1999|| style="background:gold;"|1||30||22||6||2||75||24||72||R32||UCL||GS||align="left"| Tikhonov – 19||align="left"| Romantsev
|-
||2000|| style="background:gold;"|1||30||23||1||6||69||30||70||SF||UCL  UC||GS R32||align="left"| Titov – 13||align="left"| Romantsev
|-
||2001|| style="background:gold;"|1||30||17||9||4||56||30||60||QF||UCL||2nd GS||align="left"| Titov – 11  Robson – 11||align="left"| Romantsev
|-
||2002|| style="background:bronze;"|3||30||16||7||7||49||36||55||R32||UCL||GS||align="left"| Beschastnykh – 12||align="left"| Romantsev
|-
||2003||10||30||10||6||14||38||48||36|| style="background:gold;"|W||UCL||GS||align="left"| Pavlyuchenko – 10||align="left"| Romantsev  Chernyshov  Fedotov Scala
|-
||2004||8||30||11||7||12||43||44||40||R32||UC UIC||R16 QF||align="left"| Pavlyuchenko – 10||align="left"| Scala  Starkov
|-
||2005|| style="background:silver;"|2||30||16||8||6||47||26||56||R32||colspan="2"|-||align="left"| Pavlyuchenko – 11||align="left"| Starkov
|-
||2006|| style="background:silver;"|2||30||15||13||2||60||36||58|| style="background:silver;"|RU||colspan="2"|-||align="left"| Pavlyuchenko – 18||align="left"| Starkov  Fedotov
|-
||2007|| style="background:silver;"|2||30||17||8||5||50||30||59||SF||UCL  UC||GS R32||align="left"| Pavlyuchenko – 14||align="left"| Fedotov  Cherchesov
|-
||2008||8||30||11||11||8||43||39||44||R32||UCL  UC||Qual. R32||align="left"| Bazhenov – 6  Pavlyuchenko – 6  Pavlenko – 6  Welliton – 6||align="left"| Cherchesov  M. Laudrup
|-
||2009|| style="background:silver;"|2||30||17||4||9||61||33||55||QF||colspan="2"|-||align="left"| Welliton – 21||align="left"| M. Laudrup  Karpin
|-
||2010||4||30||13||10||7||43||33||10||R16||UCL  UC||Qual. GS||align="left"| Welliton – 19||align="left"| Karpin
|-
||2011–12||style="background:silver;"|2||44||21||12||11||68||48||75||R16||UC||Qual||align="left"| Emenike – 13||align="left"| Karpin
|-
||2012–13||4||30||15||6||9||51||39||51||R16||UCL||GS||align="left"| Y. Movsisyan – 13||align="left"| Emery Karpin
|-
||2013–14||6||30||15||5||10||46||36||50||R16||UC||Qual||align="left"| Y. Movsisyan – 16||align="left"| Karpin Gunko
|-
||2014–15||6||30||12||8||10||42||42||44||R16||colspan="2"|-||align="left"| Promes – 13||align="left"| Yakin
|-
||2015–16||5||30||15||5||10||48||39||50||R16||colspan="2"|-||align="left"| Promes – 18||align="left"| Alenichev
|-
|2016–17|| style="background:gold;"|1||30||22||3||5||46||27||69||R32||UC||Qual||align="left"| Promes – 11||align="left"| Alenichev Carrera
|-
||2017–18|| style="text-align:center;background:#deb678;"|3||30||16||8||6||51||32||56||SF||UCL||GS||align="left"| Promes – 15||align="left"| Carrera
|-
||2018–19||5||30||14||7||9||36||31||49||QF||UCL  UEL||Qual. GS||align="left"| Zé Luís – 10||align="left"| Carrera Kononov 
|-
||2019–20||7||30||11||6||13||35||33||39||QF||UEL||Qual. ||align="left"| A.Sobolev – 12||align="left"| Kononov Tedesco
|-
||2020–21||style="background:silver;"|2||30||17||6||7||52||34||57||R16||colspan="2"|-||align="left"| Larsson – 15|| align="left" | Tedesco
|-
||2021–22||10||30||10||8||12||16||19||38||W|| colspan="1" | UEL||R16|| A.Sobolev – 9|| align="left" | Rui Vitoria   Vanoli
|}
Notes

Top goalscorers

Nickname
The team is usually called "red-and-whites," but among the fans "The Meat" ("Myaso") is a very popular nickname. The origins of the nickname belong to the days of the foundation of the club; in the 1920s, the team was renamed several times, from "Moscow Sports Club" to "Red Presnya" (after the name of one of the districts of Moscow) to "Pishcheviki" ("Food industry workers") to "Promkooperatsiya" ("Industrial cooperation") and finally to "Spartak Moscow" in 1935, and for many years the team was under patronage of one of the Moscow food factories that dealt with meat products.

One of the most favourite slogans of both the fans and players is, "Who are we? We're The Meat!" (? Мясо!", "Kto my? Myaso!")

Ownerships, kits and crests 

FC Spartak Moscow's main colour is red. 
In 2014, Nike unveiled kit inspired by the club's new home.

Owners, kit suppliers and shirt sponsors

Rival teams and friendships

At present, Spartak's archrival is CSKA Moscow, although this is a relatively recent rivalry that has only emerged after the collapse of the USSR. Seven of ten matches with the largest audience in Russian Premier League (including top three) were Spartak-CSKA derbies. Historically, the most celebrated rivalry is with Dynamo Moscow, a fiercely contested matchup which is Russia's oldest derby. Matches against Lokomotiv Moscow and Zenit Saint Petersburg attract thousands of people as well, almost always resulting in packed stadia. Upon the collapse of the Soviet Union, Spartak's rivalry with Dynamo Kyiv, one of the leaders of the USSR championship, was lost. Since Dynamo Kyiv now plays in the Ukrainian Premier League, both teams must qualify for UEFA tournaments to meet each other.

Since the mid-2000s the supporters of Spartak maintain brotherhood relations with Crvena Zvezda and Olympiacos ultras – a friendship based on common Orthodox faith and same club colours.
Also fans of Spartak have generally friendly relationships with Torpedo Moscow supporters.

Stadium

Until 2014, Spartak had never had its own stadium, with the team historically playing in various Moscow stadia throughout its history, even once playing an exhibition match in Red Square.  The team played home games at various Moscow stadiums – especially at the Locomotiv and Luzhniki stadiums. After the purchase of the club by Andrei Chervichenko in the early 2000s, several statements were made about the speedy construction of the stadium, but construction did not begin.

After a controlling stake in the club was bought by Leonid Fedun, real steps were taken to promote the stadium project, and in 2006, the Government of Moscow allocated land at Tushino Aeropol at a size of 28.3 hectares for the construction of the stadium. The project involved the main arena of 42,000 people with natural lawn, sports, and an entertainment hall for tennis, handball, basketball and volleyball for 12,000 spectators.  The ceremony of laying the first stone took place on 2 June 2007.

In February 2013, it was announced that as a result of a sponsorship deal with Otkritie FC Bank ("Discovery"), the stadium will be called Otkritie Arena for 6 years. The opening match at the new stadium took place on 5 September 2014, when Spartak drew with the Serbian side Red Star Belgrade (1-1). The first competitive match took place on 14 September 2014, in which Spartak defeated Torpedo Moscow 3–1 in the 7th round of the championship.

Players

Current squad

Out on loan

Notable players
Had international caps for their respective countries, or held any club record. Players whose name is listed in bold represented their countries while playing for Spartak. For further list, see List of FC Spartak Moscow players.

Russia/USSR

Former USSR countries

Europe

South and Central America

Africa

Staff
 Owner:  Vagit Alekperov,  Leonid Fedun
 Managing Director:  Yevgeni Melezhikov
 Director of Sports:  Paul Ashworth
 Head coach:  Guille Abascal
 Assistant coach:  Carlos Valle
 Assistant coach:  Vladimir Slišković
 Goalkeeping coach:  Vasili Kuznetsov
 Physical coach:  Fernando Perez Lopez
 Reserves team head coach:  Aleksei Lunin
 Reserves team assistant coach:  Aleksei Melyoshin
 Reserves team goalkeeping coach:  Vasili Kuznetsov

Coaches

References

Further reading
 
 Riordan, Jim (2008). Comrade Jim: The Spy Who Played for Spartak.

External links

 
Official fan page 
Spartak stadium website

 
Football clubs in Moscow
Spartak Moscow
Association football clubs established in 1922
1922 establishments in Russia
Soviet Top League clubs